Small Town is a live album by Bill Frisell and Thomas Morgan recorded at the Village Vanguard in 2016 and released on the ECM label the following year. It was Frisell's first album as a leader for the label since 1987's Lookout for Hope. More music from the same recording session was released in 2019 as the follow-up album, Epistrophy.

Reception
Response was generally positive, with the AllMusic review by Thom Jurek stating, "Morgan is a deeply intuitive player with a glorious earthy, woody tone. He anchors Frisell's more speculative tendencies, allowing the unexpected (and perhaps previously undiscovered) room to emerge and hold its ground between them with the seams showing. Small Town is an excellent showcase for this duo; here's hoping it's only a first volley." On  All About Jazz, John Kelman noted, "Frisell proves that it's possible to bring together original music, country music, jazz standards and more in an unfettered duet setting ... with Small Town, Frisell has clearly found another ideal musical foil to add to his growing cadre of musicians with whom he collaborates on a regular basis. Intimate, beautiful and deep, while at the same time knotty, witty and curiously skewed, Small Town delivers, in many ways, on the promise of In Line's five duo tracks 35 years on, with a live set that proves great music isn't just where you find it; it's everywhere". In The Guardian, John Fordham called it an "almost psychically empathic duo set" and observed, "Morgan’s quick anticipations of Frisell’s moves give their conversations a startling buoyancy". In Stereophile, Robert Baird wrote, "Perhaps a bit too samey in approach for newcomers to his music, this is Frisell adding yet again to his ever growing, ever impressive legacy".

Track listing
 "It Should Have Happened a Long Time Ago" (Paul Motian) – 11:05
 "Subconscious Lee" (Lee Konitz) – 7:31
 "Song for Andrew No. 1" (Bill Frisell) – 9:35
 "Wildwood Flower" (Joseph Philbrick Webster, Maud Irving) – 5:08
 "Small Town" (Bill Frisell) – 8:57
 "What a Party" (Dave Bartholomew, Fats Domino, Pearl King) – 6:41
 "Poet - Pearl" (Bill Frisell, Thomas Morgan) – 12:04
 "Goldfinger" (John Barry, Leslie Bricusse, Anthony Newley) – 7:01

Personnel
Bill Frisell – guitar
Thomas Morgan – bass

References 

2017 live albums
Bill Frisell live albums
ECM Records live albums
Albums produced by Manfred Eicher
Albums recorded at the Village Vanguard